The Hunter may refer to:

People
 Klaas-Jan Huntelaar or "The Hunter" (born 1983), Dutch footballer

Fictional characters
 Samus Aran or The Hunter, the protagonist of the Metroid video game series
 The Hunter, a character portrayed by Željko Ivanek in Heroes
 The Hunter, a character on King Leonardo and His Short Subjects
 The Hunter, a poacher and taxidermist from Little Nightmares II
 The Hunter, the main protagonist of the 2022 video game Marvel's Midnight Suns

Fiction 
 The Hunter (Stark novel), a 1962 novel by Donald E. Westlake under the pseudonym Richard Stark
 The Hunter (Leigh novel), a 1999 novel by Julia Leigh
 The Hunter (1980 film), a film starring Steve McQueen
 The Hunter (2010 film), a 2010 Iranian film
 The Hunter (2011 Russian film)
 The Hunter (2011 Australian film)
 The Hunter (cartoon), a 1931 Walter Lantz cartoon
 The Hunter (comics), a comic series by Dare Comics
 theHunter, a 2009 free-to-play game by Emote Games and Avalanche Studios
 Cacciatore: The Hunter (2018 TV series), an Italian TV show also called The Hunter, Cacciatore, Il Cacciatore

Music

Albums 

The Hunter (Ike & Tina Turner album), 1969
 The Hunter (Blondie album), 1982
 The Hunter (Jennifer Warnes album), 1992
 The Hunter (Mastodon album), 2011
 The Hunter (EP), a 2011 EP by Kele

Songs 

 "The Hunter" (Albert King song), 1967
 "The Hunter" (Dokken song), 1985
 "The Hunter" (Clannad song), 1989
 "The Hunter" (Iced Earth song), 1996
 "The Hunter", a 1984 song by Barry Gibb from Now Voyager
 "The Hunter", a 1986 song by GTR from GTR, covered by Asia

Other uses
 Orion (constellation) or the Hunter

See also 

 The Hunters (disambiguation)
 Hunter (disambiguation)